Charencey is a commune in the department of Orne, northwestern France. The municipality was established on 1 January 2018 by merger of the former communes of Saint-Maurice-lès-Charencey (the seat), Moussonvilliers and Normandel.

See also 
Communes of the Orne department

References 

Communes of Orne